Mossend and Holytown is one of the twenty-one wards used to elect members of the North Lanarkshire Council. Created in 2007, it elects three councillors.

As its name suggests, its territory comprises the localities of Mossend (as well as parts of Bellshill including the town centre east of Motherwell Road, and the Thorndean and Milnwood neighbourhoods) and neighbouring Holytown (plus part of New Stevenston – streets north of the Shotts Line railway tracks). A 2017 boundary review reduced the territory in central Bellshill slightly, and caused a small decrease in the electorate. The ward had a population of 13,480 in 2019.

Councillors

Election Results

2017 Election

 

On 10 July 2018, councillor David Baird was suspended from The SNP for 'breaking procedure'. He then sat as an Independent, before re-joining the party in 2018.

2012 Election

2007 Election

References

Wards of North Lanarkshire
Bellshill